Prince Henry of Bourbon-Parma, Count of Bardi (12 February 1851 in Parma, Duchy of Parma – 14 April 1905 in Menton, France) was the youngest son and child of Charles III, Duke of Parma and his wife Princess Louise Marie Thérèse of France, the eldest daughter of Charles Ferdinand, Duke of Berry and Princess Caroline Ferdinande Louise of the Two Sicilies.

Henry was thus a great-grandson of Charles X of France. Henry was a nephew of Henri, comte de Chambord, disputedly King of France and Navarre from 2 to 9 August 1830 and afterwards the Legitimist Pretender to the throne of France from 1844 to 1883.

Marriages
Henry married firstly to Princess Maria Luisa of Bourbon-Two Sicilies, youngest daughter of Ferdinand II of the Two Sicilies and his wife Maria Theresa of Austria, on 25 November 1873 in Cannes, France. Maria Luisa died three months later at the age of 19. The couple had no issue.

Henry married secondly to Infanta Adelgundes of Portugal, Duchess of Guimarães, fifth child and fourth daughter of Miguel of Portugal and his wife Adelaide of Löwenstein-Wertheim-Rosenberg on 15 October 1876 in Salzburg, Austria. This union was also without issue; Adelgundes' nine pregnancies all ended in miscarriages.

Residences
Henry and Adelgundes were the owners of the palazzo Ca' Vendramin Calergi on the Grand Canal in Venice. They hosted the family of Richard Wagner at their palazzo beginning in September 1882, and the famous German composer died there the following February.

Ancestry

References

Princes of Bourbon-Parma
1851 births
1905 deaths
House of Bourbon-Parma
Nobility from Parma
Counts of Bardi
Sons of monarchs

Non-inheriting heirs presumptive